The following lists events that happened during 1979 in Finland.

Incumbents
 President: Urho Kekkonen
 Prime Minister: Kalevi Sorsa (until 26 May); Mauno Koivisto (from 26 May)

Events
 10 October – The Olkiluoto Nuclear Power Plant began operations in Eurajoki, Satakunta, Finland.

Births
 1 April – Mikko Franck, orchestral conductor
 8 April – Alexi Laiho, rock musician (Children of Bodom) (d. 2020)
 23 April – Lauri Ylönen, singer (The Rasmus)
 6 April – Janne Wirman, keyboardist (Children of Bodom)
 18 July – Jaska Raatikainen, drummer (Children of Bodom)
 30 September – Juho Kuosmanen, film director and screenwriter
 17 October – Kimi Räikkönen, racing driver, 2007 Formula 1 world champion

Deaths
 26 August – Mika Waltari, author (b. 1908)

References

 
1970s in Finland
Finland
Finland
Years of the 20th century in Finland